The Cabinet Secretariat, formerly the Office of the Cabinet Secretary, was a member agency of the Cabinet of the Philippines which provided support to the President, facilitated the exchange of information, as well as discussed and resolved issues among Cabinet members. The Cabinet Secretary also acted as a coordinator and integrator of the initiatives of the President. The Cabinet Secretariat was created through Executive Order No. 237, s. 1987.

History
The position of Cabinet Secretary traced its origins to the War Cabinet of the Commonwealth government-in-exile, when Col. Manuel Nieto was appointed Secretary to the Cabinet by President Manuel L. Quezon in Asheville, NC. 
Under President Carlos P. Garcia, a Cabinet Secretariat was formally established as an attached agency of the Executive Office headed by the Executive Secretary. Under the administration of President Ferdinand Marcos, its responsibilities were transferred to the Office of the Prime Minister.

Following the People Power Revolution, the Cabinet Secretariat was reestablished through Executive Order No. 237, s. 1987 signed by President Corazon Aquino. It was renamed as the Office of the Cabinet Secretary by President Benigno Aquino III on October 31, 2012, through Executive Order No. 99. He reinstated the Office of the Cabinet Secretary as an independent body from the Presidential Management Staff, similar to its original mandate in 1987. The Cabinet Secretary was given cabinet ranking and staff support.

The office underwent a reform in 2018, when President Rodrigo Duterte issued Executive Order No. 67, which transferred eight agencies under it to other government agencies and renamed it back as the Cabinet Secretariat.

On June 30, 2022, President Bongbong Marcos issued Executive Order No. 1, which abolished the office alongside the Presidential Anti-Corruption Commission. All powers and functions will be transferred to the Presidential Management Staff.

Powers and Functions
According to Section 2 of Executive Order No. 99, the powers and functions of the Office of the Cabinet Secretary were as follows:

Reorganization
Eight agencies under the Cabinet Secretariat were placed under the jurisdiction of other agencies when President Rodrigo Duterte reorganized the office. The Technical Education and Skills Development Authority (TESDA) and the Cooperative Development Authority were placed under the Department of Trade and Industry; the National Commission on Muslim Filipinos and the Philippine Commission on Women to the Department of the Interior and Local Government (DILG); and the National Anti-Poverty Commission, the National Commission on Indigenous Peoples and the Presidential Commission on the Urban Poor to the Department of Social Welfare and Development (DSWD).

List of Cabinet Secretaries

References

External links 
 The Cabinet Secretary – Official Gazette of the Republic of the Philippines

Cabinet of the Philippines
2022 disestablishments in the Philippines
Establishments by Philippine executive order